Torgovaya square is the central square of the of Russian town Ustyuzhna in Vologda Oblast. The square had appeared in the XVI-th century and since then was the center of the social and economic life of the city. In 1778 it was redeveloped according to the architectural plans of the Catherine II's commission and received a modern form. The building of the square was formed later — from the XIX-th to early XX-th centuries.
Annual Trade fairs are held at the square.

Torgovaya square is located in the center of Ustyuzhna, on the right bank of Mologa river, at the intersection of Lenin Street and Korelyakova Lane. It is rectangular in plan, stretching from west to east. The size of the square is 210 x 140 meters.

From the east, the area is bounded by Vorozha River's pond, which separates Torgovaya Square from the Cathedral one. Together these squares form the planning kernel of the whole city. The buildings are located on all other sides along the setback lines.

References

Literature 
 
 

Ustyuzhna
Ustyuzhna